Terry Township is a township in Finney County, Kansas, USA.  As of the 2000 census, its population was 227.

Geography

Transportation
Terry Township contains two airports or landing strips: Crist Airport and R J C Farms Incorporated Airport.

References
 USGS Geographic Names Information System (GNIS)

External links
 US-Counties.com
 City-Data.com

Townships in Finney County, Kansas
Townships in Kansas